Myingyan is a city and district in the Mandalay Division of central Myanmar, previously, it was a district in the Meiktila Division of Upper Burma. It is currently the capital of Myingyan Township and lies along the National Highway 2. , the city had a population of 276,096 and the district had 1,055,957.

It lies in the valley of the Ayeyarwady River, to the south of Mandalay, on the east bank of the river. The area around the town is flat, especially to the north and along the banks of the Ayeyarwady. Inland the country rises in gently undulating slopes. The most noticeable feature is Popa Hill, an extinct volcano, to the south-east. The climate is dry, with high south winds from March until September. The ordinary crops are millet, sesame, cotton, maize, rice and a great variety of peas and beans. There are no forests, but a great deal of low scrubland. Myingyan is the head of the branch railway to Thazi and the main line between Yangon and Mandalay.

Myingyan Prison in Myingyan District was known as the most infamous detention center among Burma's political prisoners for its atrocities from early 1990s' to October 1999 when the International Committee for Red Cross (ICRC) was granted an access to the prison.

Climate
Myingyan has a hot semi-arid climate (Köppen BSh) as the city lies in the rain shadow of the Arakan Mountains which dry the monsoon rains as they descend into the central Irrawaddy Basin.

References

Township capitals of Myanmar
Populated places in Mandalay Region